Aidan Olivier (born 21 October 1984) is a South African former cricketer. He played in five first-class and three List A matches for Boland from 2006 to 2008.

See also
 List of Boland representative cricketers

References

External links
 

1984 births
Living people
South African cricketers
Boland cricketers
People from Stellenbosch
Cricketers from the Western Cape